The 2009 Turning Point was a professional wrestling pay-per-view (PPV) event produced by the Total Nonstop Action Wrestling (TNA) promotion, which took place on November 15, 2009 at the TNA Impact! Zone in Orlando, Florida. It was the sixth event under the Turning Point chronology.

In October 2017, with the launch of the Global Wrestling Network, the event became available to stream on demand. It would later be available on Impact Plus in May 2019.

Storylines

Turning Point featured eight professional wrestling matches that involved different wrestlers from pre-existing scripted feuds and storylines. Wrestlers were portrayed as villains, heroes, or less distinguishable characters in the scripted events that built tension and culminated into a wrestling match or series of matches.

Results

Reception
In 2021, the promotion’s viewers ranked the Styles vs. Daniels vs. Samoa Joe match as the Nº1 of the Top 10 World Title Matches.

References

External links
TNA Wrestling.com

Impact Wrestling Turning Point
2009 in professional wrestling in Florida
Events in Orlando, Florida
Professional wrestling in Orlando, Florida
November 2009 events in the United States
2009 Total Nonstop Action Wrestling pay-per-view events